Dead Jesus was a Canadian melodic death metal band formed in 1998 in Edmonton. The band became notorious for its live performances which often involved blood and viscera being hurled into the audience. Dead Jesus derived its name from the core belief that all organized religions are detrimental to human progress and should be laid to rest. The band played their final show on Easter Sunday in 2011 in Coaldale, Alberta.

Biography

When Your Soul Is The Sickness
Dead Jesus was formed in 1998 by core members Evil glen (guitar & vox), Org666 (vox) and Lord Bedingfield (bass). Being unable to decide upon a full-time fourth member, the band played early shows with no drummer at all, often presenting the crowd with an un-manned kit, upon which audience members were encouraged to play along. After a few months however, Dead Jesus was introduced to Alex McIntosh, and recorded a four-song demo entitled Mourning. Due to the band's abject poverty, the release was limited to a couple of hundred cassettes, but copies circulated rapidly by word of mouth with at least one copy surfacing in New York City.

In 1999, Dead Jesus bore witness to the breakup of local competitors Perceptual Distortion, and seized the opportunity to replace McIntosh with drummer Trevor Loney. With this adjustment made, the band entered Power sound Studios and recorded their full-length debut, When Your Soul Is The Sickness, featuring raw, albeit spirited takes of such classics as Roadkill, A.F. and Mortuary. The success of the release earned Dead Jesus opening slots for Cannibal Corpse, Incantation, Cryptopsy, and Napalm Death.

Let Them Suffer
Following the release of When Your Soul Is The Sickness, Loney and Bedingfield took their leave of Dead Jesus, citing personal reasons, and were replaced by Travisty and Mike Sparks respectively. Shortly thereafter, a second guitar was added to the attack in the form of Sol, and Dead Jesus re-emerged more powerful than before. In 2004, the band again recorded at Powersound, this time producing the more polished Let Them Suffer. Let Them Suffer was an immediate success, consolidating the band's local reputation as well as garnering tour dates across Canada with such bands as Deicide and Infernäl Mäjesty. At this point Dead Jesus was approached by Nuclear Blast America, who offered to sign the band on the condition that they change the name. Dead Jesus refused.

More Funerals
In 2007, change again blew the branches clean with the return of Lord Bedingfield. The band had been suffering with personality differences teetering on the brink of all-out fist fights and it was clear that something had to give. There was however, new music being written, and Dead Jesus returned to Power sound with Lord Bedingfield playing bass. The result was more Funerals, a four-song EP packaged with a short documentary edited by Drew Copeland (Death Toll Rising). The documentary features members not likely to be seen on stage with Dead Jesus again, but serves as a highly entertaining glimpse of the band during this tumultuous period.

God And The Devil
In the aftermath of More Funerals, nothing short of brilliance would be tolerable, and with this in mind Dead Jesus undertook their most ambitious and successful project to date. In hiatus, Lord Bedingfield had written a novel which he had planned to publish privately, an endeavor which had yet to see the light of day. The book was in fact gathering dust in the face of insufficient funding. One night following rehearsal, a drunken conversation with Evil glen gave rise to the notion that the novel could be paired with the band's next release, the music reflecting themes of the story. It soon became apparent that not only would more music than was currently on hand be required to properly represent the idea, but that new blood was essential to rebirth. Enter Blagerbaas (lead guitar) and Father Twelve (drums).

The skills of these new conscripts ushered in a new era for Dead Jesus, and a frenzy of writing followed. In September 2008, Dead Jesus released God And The Devil, a punishing double disc bound hard-cover including the entire text of Bedingfield's novel. The album was released at Edmonton's Starlite Room with a performance featuring 19th century prostitutes, executioners, lesbian angels, and a nine-foot effigy of Christ.

Plans to tour this release in Europe and South America are incipient at the time of writing.

Discography
1999: Into Mourning (Four song demo)
2000: When Your Soul Is the Sickness (Full-length debut)
2004: Let Them Suffer (Full-length CD)
2007: More Funerals (Four song EP with DVD)
2008: God And The Devil (Double disc with novel)
2009: Let Them Suffer (Remixed and remastered)

Band members

Last-known line up
Calvin Fehr - lead vocals
Evilglen Botchenstein - Rhythm guitar and vocals
Daemonikus - Vocals
Blagerbaas - Lead guitar
Father Twelve - Drums
Lord Bedingfield IV - Bass

Former members
Org666 - Vocals
Alex McIntosh - Drums (Into Mourning)
Trevor Loney - Drums (When Your Soul Is The Sickness)
Mike Sparks - Bass (Let Them Suffer)
Saulomen Ward - Lead guitar (Let Them Suffer, More Funerals)
Travisty - Drums (Let Them Suffer, More Funerals)

References

External links
Dead Jesus Official website

Musical groups established in 1998
Musical groups from Edmonton
Canadian death metal musical groups
Musical groups disestablished in 2011
1998 establishments in Alberta
2011 disestablishments in Alberta